Anderson Glacier was a glacier located in a cirque south of Mount Anderson in the Olympic Mountains and Olympic National Park. It flows down to about  before terminating. Meltwater from the glacier enters a lake at about  before tumbling down a steep cliff. Between 1927 and 2009, Anderson Glacier lost more than 90 percent of its surface area. By 2011, the glacier was gone. The lack of glacial meltwater from the Anderson Glacier has caused the Quinault River to reach new recorded lows.

See also
List of glaciers in the United States

References

Further reading
Anderson Glacier, Olympic Mountains, Washington Disappears (January 9, 2015)

Glaciers of the Olympic Mountains
Glaciers of Jefferson County, Washington
Glaciers of Washington (state)